Decius Marius Venantius Basilius ( 484) was a Roman official under Odoacer's rule.

Biography 

He was the son of Caecina Decius Basilius and the brother of Caecina Mavortius Basilius Decius and Caecina Decius Maximus Basilius, all Roman Consuls. Basilius Venantius iunior, Consul in 508, was probably his son.

Venantius was Praefectus urbi and Consul in 484, with Theoderic the Great as colleague.

He financed the restoration of the damages made by an earthquake to the Colosseum of Rome; two inscriptions are still extant, reading ( b and c):

Bibliography 

 Jones, Arnold Hugh Martin, John Robert Martindale, John Morris, "Decius Marius Venantius Basilius 13", The Prosopography of the Later Roman Empire, Cambridge University Press, 1992, p. 218.

5th-century Romans
5th-century Roman consuls
Decii
Marii
Imperial Roman consuls
Patricii
Urban prefects of Rome